This is a list of the most visited national monuments, including palaces, historical monuments and historic sites. It does not include churches, religious shrines and pilgrimage sites . Sources used to compile the list include an annual survey of the Association of Leading Visitor Attractions (ALVA) in the United Kingdom; the U.S. National Park Service list of National Monuments, Patrimonio Nacional of Spain, and the French and Russian Ministries of Culture.

List

See also
List of most visited museums
List of most visited art museums
List of most visited museums by region

Notes
 Statistics refer to the fiscal year ending 30 June 2017.

References

Lists of art museums and galleries
Lists of museums
Lists of palaces
Lists of monuments and memorials
Palaces and monuments